Chabayevka (Sabay) is a rural locality (a village) in Shushnursky Selsoviet, Krasnokamsky District, Bashkortostan, Russia. The population was 17 as of 2010. There is 1 street.

Geography 
Chabayevka is located 45 km southeast of Nikolo-Beryozovka (the district's administrative centre) by road. Nizhnyaya Tatya is the nearest rural locality.

References 

Rural localities in Krasnokamsky District